The South Idaho Press was a U.S. daily newspaper (except Saturday and Sunday) serving Minidoka and Cassia counties (Minidoka County Cassia County) in south-central Idaho. The paper had a circulation of 3,850. It was formerly owned by Park Communications, which was acquired by Media General in 1996. It was one of the papers that was sold to Community Newspaper Holdings the next year. GateHouse Media acquired the paper in 1998 and sold it in 2004 to Lee Enterprises, where it was a part of the Twin Falls Group along with the Times-News (Twin Falls, Idaho) and Elko Daily Free Press (Elko, Nevada).

The South Idaho Press was a consolidation and successor of the Burley Bulletin, which began in 1904 and the Burley Herald.

The South Idaho Press was merged with the Times-News in August 2008. The office and printing operation were shut down, with some of the editorial, advertising and circulation staff remaining as a bureau of the Twin Falls-based Times-News.

Notes

External links and references
 http://www.magicvalley.com

Newspapers published in Idaho

Defunct newspapers published in Idaho
2008 disestablishments in Idaho
1904 establishments in Idaho